Vejer de la Frontera is a Spanish hilltop town and municipality in the province of Cádiz, Andalusia, on the right bank of the river Barbate. The town of Vejer de la Frontera occupies a low hill overlooking the Straits of Gibraltar and surrounded by orchards and orange groves. It contains several ancient churches and convents, and the architecture of many of its houses recalls the period of Moorish rule, which lasted from 711 until the town was captured by Saint Ferdinand of Castile in 1248. Agriculture and fruit-farming are the chief industries; fighting bulls are also bred in the neighborhood and a running of the bulls is held annually.

Demographics

Festivities

Vejer Rally: It is the most important sporting event in the town, it is a test of the Andalusian Mountain Championship with more than 35 editions.

Carnaval: Traditional Cadiz-style carnival with chirigotas and comparsas and a wider range of costumes. It is held one week after the Carnival of Cádiz.

Holy Week: A sober and intimate Holy Week held in the alleys of Vejer. There are three brotherhoods: The Brotherhood of the Cristo de la Oliva which performs procession on Holy Wednesday, the Brotherhood of Nuestro Padre Jesus Nazareno, which parades on Holy Thursdays and the Brotherhood of the Soledad which performs its procession on Holy Friday. The latter two are accompanied by Saetas.

Spring Carnival: Main festivity of the town with various casetas and attractions.

Verbena de San Juan: The strawmen Juanillos and Juanillos are burned, taking the shape of important personalities during the year. The festivity also includes the fire bull.

Velada de Nuestra Señora de la Oliva: Romeria where the patron saint of the town is taken to her sanctuary.

Sister cities
  Ostuni, Italy
  Chefchaouen, Morocco
  Amboise, France

Gallery

References

External links

 Visitor information about the town and area, multilingual
 Tourist information site
 Information for English speaking visitors

Costa de la Luz
Municipalities of the Province of Cádiz